The Surya Group of Institutions consists of 11 colleges in Lucknow. The colleges were established by the Surya Bux Pal Charitable Trust in 2005. The Chairman of the group is Shri Jagdambika Pal, Member of Parliament and Ex Chief Minister of U.P. The courses have been approved by the All India Council for Technical Education, Ministry of Human Resources and Development, Govt. of India and the State Govt. All the courses are affiliated to U.P. Technical University, Lucknow.

There are two campuses. The first, for the Colleges of Engineering Science & Technology, Business Management, and Pharmacy, is located near Mohanlalganj, about 20 km from Lucknow. The second, for the School Of Planning & Engineering Management, is located near Ansal Sushant City at Hariharpur, near Lucknow.

The College of Engineering Science & Technology (CEST) was the first-established of the colleges. It offers four year B.Tech programme in five branches, namely, information technology, computer science and engineering, electronics & communication engineering, electrical and electronics engineering and mechanical engineering. It also has a two-year MBA program. The college has about 1400 students.  
 
Surya College of Business Management (SCBM) offers a 2-year Post-Graduate program leading to a Post Graduate Diploma in Management, but not an MBA degree.  The director is Seemii-Omair.  
 
The Surya School Of Planning & Engineering Management (SSPEM) has  4-year programs that lead to a B.Tech degree and a 2-year Post-Graduate course. The curriculum  follows the one prescribed by the U.P. Technical University Lucknow,  to which the college is affiliated. The Director is Prof. Yogesh Singh.

The Surya College of Pharmacy (SCP) was established in 2008. It has a 4-year program leading to a B. Pharm degree. The director is Dr. V.D. Tripathi.

References

External links

Education in Lucknow
Educational organisations based in Uttar Pradesh
2005 establishments in Uttar Pradesh
Educational institutions established in 2005